The 2021 Super League Grand Final was the 24th official Grand Final and championship-deciding game of Super League XXVI. The game was contested between Catalans Dragons and St Helens at Old Trafford.

Background
The two finalists finished first and second in the regular season with Catalans winning 19 of their 23 games and St Helens 16 out of 21. These league positions earned both clubs the chance to go to the second (semi-final) round of the play-offs and home advantage in their semi-final matches.

Route to the final

Catalans Dragons
Catalans finished first in the regular season, to claim their first League Leaders Shield since entering the competition in 2000. In their semi-final, they played Hull KR, the lowest ranked winning team from the elimination finals. Catalans won the match 28–10, with tries from Benjamin Garcia, Josh Drinkwater, Arthur Mourgue, Fouad Yaha and Joe Chan to reach their first ever grand final, and becoming the first non English team in super league era to do so.

St Helens
Reigning and defending champions St Helens finished second in the regular season and faced Leeds Rhinos (the highest ranked team to win an elimination final), in their semi-final. St Helens won the match 36–8, to reach the grand final for a 3rd consecutive year, a record 13th time.

Match details

Notes

References

Super League Grand Finals
Rugby league in England
Super League Grand Final
Grand Final
St Helens R.F.C. matches